Russom is a surname. Notable people with the surname include:

Geoffrey Russom, American philologist
Leon Russom (born 1941), American actor
Meron Russom (born 1987), Eritrean cyclist 
Neil Russom (born 1958), British cricketer
Rayna Russom (born 1974), American electronic music producer, musician and DJ
Semere Russom (born 1943), Eritrean diplomat